Frank Hrubetz & Co., Inc. was an American manufacturer of amusement park flat rides. Established in 1939, the company was located near the Salem, Oregon airport. It sold both trailer-mounted and permanent model rides to theme parks throughout the world. Models included the Meteor, Paratrooper, Round Up, and Tip Top. In 1968, the company's estimated business brought in over $1.5 million and its plant space was 25,000 square feet. By the early 1970s, Hrubetz was selling 60 rides each year, making it the second largest manufacturer of amusement rides in the United States. They closed their manufacturing doors in 1992.

History
The company was founded by Frank Hrubetz, a 1930 graduate of Oregon State College with a degree in mechanical engineering. Hrubetz worked for the Eyerly Aircraft Company which developed a 10-foot airplane on a fixed base for training pilots. Called the Orientator, it used a small electric propeller and could climb, dive and turn. The company discovered it was more profitable as entertainment after one buyer placed the trainer on the corner of Hollywood and Vine in Los Angeles as an amusement ride. While working for Lee Eyerly, Hrubetz helped develop other rides including the Loop-O-Plane and later Roll-O-Plane—two small bullet-shaped cars that spun rapidly on a vertical axis. In 1939, Hrubetz left Eyerly to become a competitive manufacturer with Frank Hrubetz & Co.

Flat rides
Paratrooper—Ten double-seat gondolas spinning on a hanging arm.
Round Up—Oval-shaped cages rotating on an angled platform
Meteor—3 oval-shaped cages rotating on an angled platform
Hi-Ball—Tower with a gondola that raised to the top and spun
Screwball—Only one ever built and never sold to the public. No images ever taken. Very little is known about this ride... Capell Brother's Shows owned one in late 1950s.-early 1960s.
Spitfire
Tip Top - Ten 2-person spinning tubs on a rotating platform
Fireball

References

Gallery

External links
 The Flat Joint - Amusement, Fair and Carnival Rides Rides, by manufacturer.

Manufacturing companies based in Oregon
Amusement ride manufacturers
Companies based in Salem, Oregon
Manufacturing companies established in 1939
Manufacturing companies disestablished in 1992
1939 establishments in Oregon
1992 disestablishments in Oregon